Amos is a town in northwestern Quebec, Canada, on the Harricana River. It is the seat of Abitibi Regional County Municipality.

Amos is the main town on the Harricana River, and the smallest of the three primary towns — after Rouyn-Noranda and Val-d'Or — in the Abitibi-Témiscamingue region of Quebec. Its main resources are spring water, gold and wood products, including paper. In 2012, Quebec Lithium Corp. re-opened Canada's first lithium mine, which had operated as an underground mine from 1955–65. They are planning to carve an open pit mine over pegmatite dikes. (The pegmatite is about 1% lithium carbonate.) It is in the northeast corner of La Corne Township. Access to the mine is via paved road from Val d'Or.

The smaller communities of Lac-Gauvin and Saint-Maurice-de-Dalquier are also within the municipal boundaries of Amos.

History

Rupert's Land, in which Abitibi was located, was owned by the Hudson's Bay Company and was bought by Canada in 1869. Abitibi itself was then annexed to the province in Quebec on June 13, 1898, by an act of the federal Parliament.

Amos was the starting point for the colonization of the region of Abitibi that began in 1910. The municipality was established in 1914 while the city itself was chartered in 1925. The name of the city came from the maiden name of the wife of Sir Lomer Gouin, then premier of Quebec.

A related municipality was created in 1917 under the name 'Municipalité de la partie ouest des cantons unis de Figuery et Dalquier' (Municipality of the western part of the united townships of Figuery and Dalquier) which changed its name to Amos-Ouest in 1949. In 1974 the municipality fused with the city of Amos proper. Another related municipality was created in 1918 under the name 'Municipalité de la partie est des cantons Figuery et Dalquier' (Municipality of the eastern part of the united townships of Figuery and Dalquier), which also changed its name later 1950 to Amos-Est. The municipality was finally integrated into the city of Amos itself in 1987.

Government

The current mayor of the city is Sébastien D'Astous, who took office on February 20, 2015, after winning a by-election following the death in office of former Mayor Ulrick Chérubin in September 2014. In the by-election D'Astous, formerly a city councillor, defeated Donald Blanchet, who had served as interim mayor between Chérubin's death and the by-election.

In the National Assembly of Quebec, Amos is within the electoral district of Abitibi-Ouest, represented by Coalition Avenir Québec MNA Suzanne Blais. In the House of Commons of Canada, the city is in the Abitibi—Témiscamingue district, represented by Bloc Québécois MP Sébastien Lemire.

Amos is the seat of the judicial district of Abitibi.

Mayors
Hector Authier, 1914-1918
David Gourd, 1918-1921
Joseph Grenier, 1921-1923
J.O. Germain, 1923-1928
T.A. Lalonde, 1928-1929
J.É. Montambault, 1929-1931
Julien Beaudry, 1931-1934
G.A. Brunet, 1934-1939
Fridolin Simard, 1939-1943
G.A. Brunet, 1943-1947
Fridolin Simard, 1947-1957
G.A. Brunet, 1957-1965
Gérard Magny, 1965-1971
Jean-Hugues Boutin, 1971-1974
Laurier St-Laurent, 1974-1982
Marcel Lesyk, 1982-1987
Jean-Paul Veilleux, 1987-1990
André Brunet, 1990-1998
Murielle Angers-Turpin, 1998-2002
Ulrick Chérubin, 2002-2014
Donald Blanchet, 2014-2015
Sébastien D'Astous, 2015–present

Media

Transportation
Passenger trains no longer serve Amos, but the town once had a Canadian National Railway station.
Amos is served by Quebec highways 109, 111 and 395 and Amos/Magny Airport.

Demographics 

Climate
Amos has a humid continental climate (Köppen Dfb), just above a subarctic climate (Dfc), with warm summers, frigid winters and heavy precipitation for most of the year.

References

External links

Ville d'Amos

 
Cities and towns in Quebec